Valencia burmeisteri is a species of Psocoptera from the family Caeciliusidae that can be found in United Kingdom, and sometimes Ireland. They are also common in Austria, Belgium, Bulgaria, Canary Islands, Croatia, Denmark, Finland, France, Germany, Greece, Hungary, Italy, Latvia, Luxembourg, Madeira, Norway, Poland, Portugal, Romania, Spain, Sweden, Switzerland, and the Netherlands. It is also widespread in Near East. The species are  yellowish-black coloured.

Habitat 
The species feeds on beech, cedar, Chinese juniper, fir, hawthorn, hemlock, juniper, larch, oak, pine, Sequoia, spruce and yew.

References 

Caeciliusidae
Insects described in 1876
Psocoptera of Europe